Esterson is a surname. Notable people with the surname include:

 Aaron Esterson (1923–1999), British psychiatrist
 Bill Esterson (born 1966), British politician